Neckargemünd is a town in Germany, in the district of Rhein-Neckar-Kreis, state of Baden-Württemberg. It lies on the Neckar, 10 km upriver from Heidelberg at the confluence with the river Elsenz. This confluence of the two rivers is the origin of the name, as Neckargemünd means confluence of the Neckar. As of 2006, there were 14,122 inhabitants.

History
The region has been occupied by people for a half a million years as shown by the find of Homo heidelbergensis in nearby Mauer in 1907. Stone shards and stone axes have been found from the Early Stone Age. During Roman times the area was settled by Celts and Suebi. Grave stones from the 2nd and 3rd century in Kleingemünd show Celtic names. From the end of the 5th century the Franks held sway over the region. An iron spear tip and two iron arrow heads were left behind in Neckargemünd.
 
Neckargemünd was founded in the 10th century, most likely as a fishing village. Neckargemünd was first mentioned by name in documents in 988. Otto III, Holy Roman Emperor enfeoffed Hildebald, Bishop of Worms, with the royal forests around Wimpfen and Neckarbischofsheim. Neckargemünd was named as the northwest corner of this area: a loco Gemundi ubi Elisinzia fluvius influit Neccaro fluvio. The counts of Lauffen also played a role in the region after making Dilsberg the seat of their domain. Neckargemünd became a free town in 1286. In 1395 it passed to the elector palatine and, together with the surrounding district, became part of Baden in 1814.

Population development
Neckargemünd with Kleingemünd

Neckargemünd with current boroughs

Boroughs
Neckargemünd includes a number of boroughs (Ortsteile) not part of the core settlement Neckargemünd. 
 Kleingemünd (1 January 1907) – independent from 1860-1906
 Dilsberg (1 January 1973) - a small historic village with a medieval castle ruin, the village includes Neuhof, Dilsbergerhof and Rainbach 
 Waldhilsbach (1 January 1974)
 Mückenloch (1 January 1975)

Mayors
 1855–1861: Georg Reibold 
 1862–1867: Julius Friedrich Menzer
 1867–1873: Carl Heckmann
 1873–1899: Carl Thilo
 1899–1902: Carl Wittmann
 1903–1909: Franz Heeg
 1909–1910: Wilhelm Steinbrunn
 1910–1917: Georg Schneider
 1917–1919: Carl Kirchmayer
 1919–1928: Dr. Emil Leist
 1928–1939: Georg Müßig
 1939–1942: Wilhelm Cloos 
 1942–1945: Gottfried Kramer (first vice mayor, then mayor)
 1945–1948: Georg Lampertsdörfer
 1948–1966: Heinrich Held (1948–1951 temporary)
 1966–1984: Kurt Schieck
 1984–2000: Oskar Schuster
 2000-2016: Horst Althoff (CDU)
 2016–: Frank Volk

Twin towns – sister cities

Neckargemünd is twinned with:
 Evian-les-Bains, France (1970)
 Missoula, United States (1993)
 Jindřichův Hradec, Czech Republic (1996)
 Romeno, Italy (1996)

Neckargemünd also has friendly relations with Valeč in the Czech Republic.

Notable people
Rainer Ohlhauser (born 1941), footballer

References

External links
 Official Website

Towns in Baden-Württemberg
Rhein-Neckar-Kreis
Populated places on the Neckar basin
Populated riverside places in Germany